Countdown to Ecstasy is the second studio album by the American rock band Steely Dan, released in July 1973 by ABC Records. It was recorded at Caribou Ranch in Nederland, Colorado, and at The Village Recorder in West Los Angeles, California. After the departure of vocalist David Palmer, the group recorded the album with Donald Fagen singing lead on every song.

Although it was a critical success, the album failed to generate a hit single, and consequently charted at only number 35 on the Billboard Top LPs & Tape chart. It was eventually certified gold by the Recording Industry Association of America (RIAA) in 1978, having shipped 500,000 copies in the United States. Well-received upon its release, Countdown to Ecstasy received perfect scores from music critics in retrospective reviews.

Musical style 
Like Steely Dan's 1972 debut album Can't Buy a Thrill, Countdown to Ecstasy has a rock sound that exhibits a strong influence from jazz. It comprises uptempo, four-to-five-minute rock songs, which, apart from the bluesy vamps of "Bodhisattva" and "Show Biz Kids", are subtly textured and feature jazz-inspired interludes. Countdown to Ecstasy was the only album written by Steely Dan for a live band. "My Old School" features reverent horns and aggressive piano riffs and guitar solos. "The Boston Rag" develops from a jazzy song to unrefined playing by the band, including a distorted guitar solo by Jeff "Skunk" Baxter. Jim Hodder's drumming eschews rock music for pop and jazz grooves. Bop-style jazz soloing is set in the context of a pop song on "Bodhisattva". Commenting on the album's style and production, Tom Hull says it is "clean, almost slick", with "no dissonance, no clutter", reminiscent of 1940s bop and "the overproduced early 60s pop rock".

Lyrics and themes 
Countdown to Ecstasy has lyrical themes similar to Can't Buy a Thrill. It explores topics such as drug abuse, class envy, and West Coast excess. "My Old School" is inspired by a drug bust involving Walter Becker and Donald Fagen at Bard College, "King of the World" explores a post-nuclear holocaust United States, and "Show Biz Kids" satirizes contemporary Los Angeles lifestyles. Hull describes their lyrics as "a running paste together joke ... sufraintelligent, witty and slyly devious", citing as an example the following lyrics from "Show Biz Kids": "They got the booze they need / All that money can buy / They got the shapely bods / They got the Steely Dan T-shirt / And for the coup-de-gras / They're outrageous." "Your Gold Teeth" follows a jaded female grifter who uses her attractiveness and cunning.

According to Rob Sheffield, Fagen and Becker's lyrics on the album portray America as "one big Las Vegas, with gangsters and gurus hustling for souls to steal." He views it as the first in Steely Dan's trilogy of albums that, along with Pretzel Logic (1974) and Katy Lied (1975), showcase "a film noir tour of L.A.'s decadent losers, showbiz kids, and razor boys." Erik Adams of The A.V. Club writes that the album is a "dossier of literate lowlifes, the type of character studies that say, 'Why yes, the name Steely Dan is an allusion to a dildo described in Naked Lunch.' These characters hang around the corners of the entire Steely Dan discography, but they come into their own on Countdown to Ecstasy".

Other songs explore more spiritual concerns. The opening song "Bodhisattva" is a parody of the idea that the disposal of one's possessions is a prerequisite to spiritual enlightenment. Its title refers to the Bodhisattva, those of the belief that they have achieved spiritual perfection but remain in the material world to help others. Fagen summarized the song's message as "Lure of East. Hubris of hippies. Quick fix". "Razor Boy" is a bitter, ironic pop song with lyrics that subtly criticize complacency and materialism. According to Ivan Kreilkamp of Spin, "Steely Dan speaks to us from that 'cold and windy day' when the trappings of hipness and sexiness fall away to reveal a lonely figure waiting for a fix. 'Will you still have a song to sing when the razor boy comes and takes your fancy things away?' Fagen asks a generation stupefied by nostalgia and self-involvement".

Title and packaging 
The album was titled as a joke about attempts to rationalize a state of spirituality. The original cover painting was by Fagen's then-girlfriend Dorothy White. At the insistence of ABC Records president Jay Lasker, however, several figures had to be added when he found the discrepancy between five band members and three figures on the cover unacceptable. The proofs for the album cover were later stolen during a dispute over the final layout. The back cover features an orchid surrounded by the band and their recording equipment.

Marketing and sales 
Countdown to Ecstasy was released in July 1973 by ABC Records in the United States and Probe Records in the United Kingdom. It was less commercially successful than Can't Buy a Thrill. The album failed to generate a hit single, and only charted at number 35 on the Billboard Top LPs & Tape chart. Nonetheless, it spent 34 weeks on the chart, and was eventually certified gold, in 1978, by the Recording Industry Association of America (RIAA), having shipped 500,000 copies in the United States.

Critical reception and legacy 

Countdown to Ecstasy was met with positive reviews. Reviewing in August 1973 for Rolling Stone, David Logan said that the album's musical formula, while not redundant, said that despite ordinary musicianship and occasionally absurd lyrics, Steely Dan's "control" of their basic rock format is "refreshing" and "bodes well for the group's longterm success." Billboard complimented the "studio effect" of the dual guitar playing and found the "grandiloquent vocal blend" catchy. Stereo Review called it a "really excellent album" with "witty and tasteful" arrangements, "winning" performances, "high quality" songs, and a "potent and persuasive" mix of rock, jazz, and pop styles. In Creem, Robert Christgau observed "studio-perfect licks that crackle and buzz when you listen hard" and "invariably malicious" vocals that back the group's obscure lyrics. He named Countdown to Ecstasy the ninth best album of 1973 in his year-end list for Newsday. Hull, in a review published in Overdose in April 1975, said the album is "perhaps the most representative [and] certainly the best realized" of Steely Dan's confounding mix of smooth production quality and intellectual lyrical content. "The effect is strange, strangely comfortable, queasy almost", he explained, calling the band "a dangerous group, one that should be watched".

In Christgau's Record Guide: Rock Albums of the Seventies (1981), Christgau said that Steely Dan had achieved a "deceptively agreeable studio slickness" with Fagen's replacement of Palmer, who Christgau felt did not fit the group. Music journalist Paul Lester later viewed it as a progression from their debut album and wrote that "Becker and Fagen offered cruel critiques of the self-obsessed 'Me' decade", while their "blend of cool jazz and bebop, Brill Building song craft and rock was unparallelled at the time (only Britain's 10cc were creating such intelligent pop in the early Seventies)." In his 1999 autobiography A Cure for Gravity, British musician Joe Jackson described Countdown to Ecstasy as a musical revelation for him, that bridged the gap between "pure pop" and his jazz-rock and progressive influences, while furthering his attempts at songwriting. In The Rolling Stone Album Guide (2004), Rob Sheffield called Countdown to Ecstasy "a thoroughly amazing, hugely influential album" with "cold-blooded L.A. studio rock tricked out with jazz piano and tough guitar." Pat Blashill later wrote in Rolling Stone that the "joy in these excellent songs" and in the band's playing revealed Steely Dan to be "human, not just brainy," "like good stretches of the Stones' Exile on Main St." AllMusic's Stephen Thomas Erlewine found Countdown to Ecstasy musically "riskier" than the band's debut album, and wrote that the songs are "rich with either musical or lyrical detail that their album rock or art rock contemporaries couldn't hope to match." Chris Jones of BBC Music found Steely Dan's ideas to be "post-modern" and "erudite," and asserted that they were "setting a benchmark that few have ever matched."

Countdown to Ecstasy has appeared on several professional listings of the greatest albums. In 2000, it was voted number 307 in Colin Larkin's All Time Top 1000 Albums. Based on such rankings, the aggregate website Acclaimed Music lists it as the 662nd most acclaimed album in history and the 183rd most acclaimed from the 1970s. The album was also included in the book 1001 Albums You Must Hear Before You Die.

Track listing

Personnel 

Steely Dan
 Donald Fagen – acoustic and electric pianos, synthesizer, lead and backing vocals
 Walter Becker – electric bass, harmonica, backing vocals
 Denny Dias – electric guitar, mixing
 Jeff "Skunk" Baxter – electric and pedal steel guitars
 Jim Hodder – drums, percussion, backing vocals

Additional musicians
 Ray Brown – string bass on "Razor Boy"
 Ben Benay – acoustic guitar
 Rick Derringer – slide guitar on "Show Biz Kids" (recorded at Caribou Ranch, Nederland, Colorado, courtesy of Columbia Records)
 Victor Feldman – vibraphone, marimba, percussion
 Ernie Watts, Johnny Rotella, Lanny Morgan, Bill Perkins – saxophones (6)
 Sherlie Matthews (6), Myrna Matthews (6), Patricia Hall (6), Royce Jones, David Palmer, James Rolleston, Michael Fennelly – backing vocals

Production
 Producer: Gary Katz
 Engineer: Roger Nichols
 Assistant engineer: Miss Natalie
 Album design: Dotty of Hollywood
 Photography: Ed Caraeff

Reissue
 Reissue producers: Walter Becker, Donald Fagen
 Remastering engineer: Roger Nichols
 Reissue design: Red Herring Design, New York City
 Consultant: Daniel Levitin

Charts 
Album

Singles

References

Bibliography

External links 
 
 "Steely Dan: Reelin' in the Years" (Chapter on Countdown to Ecstasy) at Google Books
 "Top Ten Obscure Steely Dan Lyrics"  by Stylus Magazine

Steely Dan albums
1973 albums
ABC Records albums
Albums produced by Gary Katz